is a 1981 Japanese film directed by Yasuo Furuhata. Among many awards, it was chosen as Best Film at the Japan Academy Prize ceremony.

Cast
 Ken Takakura: Eiji Mikami
 Chieko Baisho: Kiriko (1979) Michio
 Ayumi Ishida: Naoko Mikami (1968)
 Setsuko Karasuma: Suzuko Yoshimatsu (1976)
 Kai Atō: Ryosuke Honjo
 Yu Fujiki: Ichiro Mikami
 Akihiko Hirata
 Ryō Ikebe: Chief Nakagawa
 Ken Iwabuchi: Yoshitaka Mikami
 Tanie Kitabayashi: Masayo Mikami
 Yuko Kotegawa: Fuyuko Mikami
 Sachiko Murase: Ryosuke's mother
 Hideo Murota: Shigeru Morioka
 Toshiyuki Nagashima: Michio Mikami
 Akira Nagoya: Takada
 Jinpachi Nezu: Goro Yoshimatsu
 Junkichi Orimoto 
 Hideji Otaki: Aiba
 Nenji Kobayashi : Detective Tasumi
 Kei Satō
 Tetsuya Takeda
 Masao Komatsu
 Kunie Tanaka: Sugawara
 Minori Terada: Chikaraishi
 Ryudo Uzaki: Yukio Kinoshita
 Masako Yagi: Aiba's wife

Reception

Awards and nominations
5th Japan Academy Prize 
Won: Best Picture
Won: Best Screenplay - Sou Kuramoto
Won: Best Actor - Ken Takakura
Won: Best Music - Ryudo Uzaki
Won: Best Sound Recording - Nobuyuki Tanaka
Nominated: Best Director - Yasuo Furuhata
Nominated: Best Actress - Chieko Baisho
Nominated: Best Actor in a Supporting Role - Ryudo Uzaki
Nominated: Best Actress in a Supporting Role -  Ayumi Ishida and Setsuko Karasuma
Nominated: Best Cinematography - Daisaku Kimura
Nominated: Best Lighting Direction - Hideki Mochizuki
Nominated: Best Art Direction - Yukio Higuchi

References

Bibliography
 
 
 
 
 

1981 films
1981 drama films
Films directed by Yasuo Furuhata
Japanese drama films
1980s Japanese-language films
Picture of the Year Japan Academy Prize winners
Films with screenplays by Sô Kuramoto
Films set in Hokkaido
1980s Japanese films